Karen Olsen may refer to:

Karen Olsen (weather presenter) on One News (New Zealand)
Karen Olsen (Coronation Street), fictional character
Karen Olsen, character in Familien Olsen

See also
Karen Olsen Beck
Karen Olsson (disambiguation)
Karin Olsson (disambiguation)